Landolphia kirkii (known as sand apricot-vine, rubber vine or Kirk's landolphia) is a species of liana from the family Apocynaceae that can be found in Democratic Republic of the Congo, Malawi, Mozambique, Tanzania, Zambia, Zimbabwe, and in the KwaZulu-Natal province of South Africa.

Description
They are glossy green coloured from above, and have a channeled midrib. They have 10-12 pairs of lateral veins, with a net-veining that is slightly raised just above the midrib, that is pubescent underneath.

Systematics
The specific epithet kirkii commemorates John Kirk, a companion of David Livingstone, who traveled to Zambezia for an expedition in 1858.

The Bungo fruit widely growing on Pemba and Zanzibar islands in the Indian Ocean highly likely belongs to this species.

References

External links
 

Rauvolfioideae
Flora of Africa